The Bremen City Hall is the seat of the President of the Senate and Mayor of the Free Hanseatic City of Bremen.  It is one of the most important examples of Brick Gothic and Weser Renaissance architecture in Europe.  Since 1973, it has been a protected historical building. In July 2004, along with the Bremen Roland statue, the building was added to the list of UNESCO World Heritage Sites because of its outstanding architecture and its testimony to the development of civic autonomy in the Holy Roman Empire.

Location and description 

The city hall is on the northeastern side of the market square in the historic city center. Directly in front of it is the statue of Roland. On the opposite side of that square there is the ancient guildhall, called Schütting, still today seat of the board of commerce. On the southeastern side of the square is the seat of Bremen state parliament, called the Bürgerschaft. East of both, there is the town hall and parliament, along with the Bremen Cathedral. Near the northern corner of the town hall, there is a sculpture of the Town Musicians of Bremen (by Gerhard Marcks). North of it, there is the Church of Our Dear Lady ("Kirche Unser Lieben Frauen" or short "Liebfrauenkirche").

The old town hall itself, originally constructed in the 15th century, is a rectangular, two-storey hall measuring 41.5 by 15.8 m. The ground floor contains one large hall with oak pillars, historically used for merchants and theatre, and the upper floor contained the main festivity hall.

History

The ancient town hall 

Bremen's original town hall had been situated in the southern end of the block between Liebfrauenkirchhof ("Our Dear Lady's Churchyard"), Obernstraße ("Highstreet") and Sögestraße ("Pigstreet"). In 1229, it was mentioned as "domus theatralis" ("show house"), since 1251 repeatedly as "domus consularis" ("councilars' house"). An arch across the Sögestraße and a repair by a mason suggest a stone building, and already existing before the arrival of Gothic style it must have been erected in Romanesque style. It is assumed that before the municipality gained a certain autonomy, the building served as a law court and therefore had at least one open hall, as old Saxon law forbade trials to be held in closed rooms.
An exact description is not available, but several documents tell about the cloth shops in that location. They describe the locations of "sub" ("below") being the town hall and the office. Depending on the interpretation of "below" as "in the hall below …" or "in front of the basement of …", the documents suggest very different settings of the town hall and its environment. Two texts tell of a stair or staircase of the house at Liebfrauenkirchhof.

After the construction of the newer town hall, it was hired out to the grocers' guild, than as a hobs store. Finally in 1598, it was sold to two owners, who converted it to or replaced it as their private houses.

The Gothic town hall 

Around 1400, when the development of Bremen was at its height, a new town hall was planned and built. Most engaged were burgomaster Johann Hemeling and councilmen Friedrich Wagner and Hinrich von der Trupe. The location and design were a demonstration of confidence vis-à-vis the archbishop. Bremen Market Square, completed a century before, was now dominated by the town hall rather than by the cathedral and the archbishop's palace. Both of its two halls, the upper hall and the lower hall, were a few inches longer and wider than the great hall of the episcopal palace. As in the palace, the entrances were placed at the sides rather than facing the square. The Ratskeller is below those halls.

With the construction of the town hall, the first Roland sculpture was erected in front of it. It was not yet as large as today.

The town hall in Gothic style was decorated with 16 large sculptures, showing emperors and prince-electors, demonstrating Bremen's claim of being an imperial city, and four ancient philosophers. But at the same time it was fortified; there were two wall-walks, one above the gallery towards the market square and one all around the gutters of the hip-roof. Four small towers with staircases served the access from the upper hall to the upper wall-walk. The gallery on ground level towards the market square during the first centuries was no shelter for merchants, it was reserved for trials.

On the rear side of the Gothic town hall, there was an extension, in the upper floor containing the room for the city council, called Altes Wittheits-Stube, (The Old Council Chamber). West of it, there was an outer staircase from Our Dear Lady's Churchyard to the upper hall.

After the Rebellion of the 104 Men  in 1432, the outer staircase was removed. In the end of 15th century, an office was built below the old Wittheits-Stube.

Renaissance 
In 1545 to 1550, an extension with three floors, containing a new Wittheits-Stube and offices, was built between the town hall and the archbishop's palace, showing a Renaissance style gable eastward facing the cathedral.

In the end of the century, Bremen lived through its second boom, and a great relaunch of the town hall was headed. The main artist was the architect and mason Lüder von Bentheim. The modernization took place in two steps: in the first step, during 1595 to 1596, the ten windows of the upper hall towards the market square were converted from pointed arches to large rectangular windows. About twelve years later, from 1608 to 1612, a great transformation to Weser Renaissance was started: The two middling windows and the proclamation door between them were displaced by a huge avant-corps, consisting of slim pillars and columns and large windows. On top, a decorated gable in Flemish Renaissance style was erected, two similar gables beside. Reliefs were used to decorate the facade.  Many architectural elements based on masters of the Dutch Renaissance, such as Hans Vredeman de Vries, Hendrik Goltzius and Jacob Floris. Furthermore, decorative balustrades were installed.

Baroque 

Soon after the completion of those works, Germany was ravaged by the Thirty Years' War, and after the Peace of Westphalia, Bremen had to defend against Swedish invasion.

In 1682/83, The office on the rear side was enlarged in a form of Baroque style – with horizontal rows of windows that did not become common before two centuries later.

19th century 
With the German mediatization in 1803, the neighboring archbishop's palace that had been extraterritorial, at last Hanoveran, became a municipal property. Provisionally, it was used for offices at once. In 1818/19, it was partly dismantled and rebuilt as the Neoclassical "Stadthaus" (municipal office building). In 1826, dangerous damage to representative town hall and its extensions was detected. With the repairs, the appearance of the market front was conserved, but the eastern Renaissance façade was replaced by a simple one and the rear side lost its unique design.

20th century 

From 1820 to 1900, Bremen multiplied its population, and, in the decades around 1900, Wilhelminism preferred abundant representation. Therefore, an enlargement of the town hall was planned. In 1909, the Stadthaus was dismantled in order to build the new town hall on its ground. During that work, many Gothic artifacts were found, significantly more than historians expected. With the "Neues Rathaus" ("New Town Hall"), the town hall in 1909–1913 received an extension about twice as large as the old building. The Munich architect Gabriel von Seidl succeeded to avoid a dominance of his addition. Nevertheless, its three Neo-renaissance facades are a very late example of Historism. The fourth one, facing the Church of Our Lady and adjacent to the rest of the Baroque extension, is rather Art Nouveau.

By boarding up the outer walls, and due to heroic efforts of the fire brigade, the town hall of Bremen survived the air raids of World War II with little damage, though more than sixty percent of the city was destroyed.

Usage 
As mentioned above, the seat of the Burgomaster of Bremen is in the New Town Hall.
The Bremer Schaffermahlzeit a traditional annual banquet for the captains, is held in the banquet hall of the New Town Hall.
Many ceremonial events are held in the upper hall of the Old Town Hall.
The lower hall of the historical building is frequently used for exhibitions.

Main sights

Old Town Hall 
The Upper Hall (Obere Rathaushalle). It is still Bremen's official for meetings.
The Golden Chamber (Güldenkammer). This small room, added to the upper hall in 1608, was redecorated in 1905 by Heinrich Vogeler in a pure Art Nouveau style.  All details and fittings, including door handles, fireguard, chandeliers and the gilded leather wallpaper (cuir de Cordoue) have been selected in this style.
The Lower Hall (Untere Rathaushalle).  This room retains its unadorned original form. In contrast to the upper chamber, this room is much simpler, with a stone floor, visible timber beams, and whitewashed walls. In earlier times, it also functioned as a marketplace for fine-goods such as spices and cloths. Nowadays it is used for exhibitions.
The Bremer Ratskeller is a public house in the basement, the home of the oldest barrel of wine in Germany, crafted in 1653.

New Town Hall 
The banquet hall
The fireplace room
The Gobelin room
The Senate Hall

Gallery

Sources 

 Konrad Elmshäuser: Der erste Roland und das erste Rathaus von Bremen, In: Bremisches Jahrbuch, vol. 84, Bremen 2005, p. 9–45
 Rudolf Stein: Romanische, gotische und Renaissancebaukunst in Bremen, Bremen 1962, p. 239–276 und 529–676

References

External links 

City of Bremen official website – in German and English
Town Hall and Roland on the Marketplace of Bremen – UNESCO website

City hall
City and town halls in Germany
City hall
City hall
World Heritage Sites in Germany
Buildings and structures completed in 1400
1400s establishments in the Holy Roman Empire
Brick Gothic
Gothic architecture in Germany
City hall